Emma Frances Dawson (1839–1926) was an American poet and writer of supernatural fiction.

Life

Dawson was born in New England, but by 1880 was living in California, eventually in San Francisco, the setting for most of her stories.  Following the 1906 earthquake, she moved to Palo Alto.

Work

Dawson wrote short stories and poems, originally printed in regional publications such as the Argonaut and Overland Monthly.  Most of her fiction was reprinted in a collection An Itinerant House, and Other Stories (see references).  The work is notable not just for its merit as atmospheric supernatural fiction, but for its detailed description of 19th century San Francisco.  Ambrose Bierce, who seems to have been a mentor to Dawson in her literary efforts, praised her work as some of the best being written in the West Coast and representative of the region (as well as having similar high praise for verse).

Despite critical praise and local celebrity status (she was often invited to give public readings of her poems), she struggled to make a living as a writer; reprinting one of her poems, an 1898 newspaper reported she was "so poor that she could not pay her rent last week till the recipient of $50 at the hands of (San Francisco) Mayor Phelan."

Publications

 Contents: An Itinerant House; Singed Moths; A Stray Reveler; The Night Before the Wedding; The Dramatic is My Destiny; A Gracious Visitation; A Sworn Statement; "The Second Card Wins"; In Silver Upon Purple; "Are the Dead Dead?"

 Reprint of 1897 collection with biographical introduction and several additional stories: The Romance of a Lodger; A Dead-Head; Shadowed; The Enchanted Ship (translation of "Die Geschichte von dem Gespensterschiff" by Wilhelm Hauff).

References

Works by Emma Frances Dawson in the University of Michigan Making of America Journal Archive

1839 births
1926 deaths
American women poets
19th-century American poets
20th-century American poets
19th-century American women writers
20th-century American women writers